Comprehensive Psychiatry is a bimonthly peer-reviewed medical journal covering psychopathology. It was established in 1960 and is published by Elsevier. The editor-in-chief is Naomi Fineberg (University of Hertfordshire). According to the Journal Citation Reports, the journal has a 2017 impact factor of 2.128.

References

External links

Psychopathology
Psychiatry journals
Elsevier academic journals
Bimonthly journals
Publications established in 1960
English-language journals